Oxalicibacterium flavum is a Gram-negative, rod-shaped, non-spore-forming, yellow-pigmented, and oxalotrophic bacterium from the genus Oxalicibacterium and family Oxalobacteraceae. Its 16S rRNA gene sequence analysis has shown that it belongs to the order  Betaproteobacteria.

References

External links
Type strain of Oxalicibacterium flavum at BacDive -  the Bacterial Diversity Metadatabase

Burkholderiales
Bacteria described in 2003